Raul Melgoza was a Mexican-American fashion designer. Melgoza designed clothes for royalty, celebrities and actresses.

Career
In 2006, after graduating from Parsons, Melgoza became well known in the New York fashion scene, and became the Creative Designer for the haute couture fashion house, LUCA LUCA. By the fall collection of 2008, the fashion house saw rise in attention and sales. He designed dresses for personalities including Amy Adams, Emma Stone, Ashley Tisdale, Jamie-Lynn Sigler, Carol Alt, Serena Williams and Petra Nemcova.

Melgoza died on July 18, 2020, of lung cancer.

See also
List of fashion designers
List of Parsons The New School for Design people

References

External links

1975 births
Living people
Mexican fashion designers
Luxury brands
People from Manhattan
American people of Mexican descent
Parsons School of Design alumni